Lake St. Peter Provincial Park is a recreation-class provincial park in the municipality of Hastings Highlands, Hastings County, Ontario, Canada. It is operated by the Ontario Parks branch of the Ontario Ministry of Natural Resources and Forestry.

The main access gatehouse also contains a small store supplying minimal camping equipment, firewood, ice and rental canoes.

The shore of the southwestern tip of McKenzie Lake is part of the park, at its northern edge, but none of the lake itself.

References

External links

Provincial parks of Ontario
Protected areas of Hastings County
Protected areas established in 1990
1990 establishments in Ontario